Máfil (Mapudungun for embraced between rivers) is a city and commune of the Valdivia Province, Los Ríos Region in southern Chile, about 30 km northeast  of Valdivia. The main economic activities of Máfil are forestry, cattle farming, cultivation and gold and coal mining the Madre de Dios and Mulpún areas.  Its population was 7,213 persons per the 2002 census.

Demographics
Of these, 3,796 (52.6%) lived in urban areas and 3,417 (47.4%) in rural areas. The population fell by 7% (547 persons) between the 1992 and 2002 censuses.

Administration
As a commune, Máfil is a third-level administrative division of Chile administered by a municipal council, headed by an alcalde who is directly elected every four years. the alcalde is Claudio Sepúlveda Miranda r.

References

External links
  Municipality of Máfil

Populated places in Valdivia Province
Communes of Chile
Populated places established in 1964